Faik is a given name. Notable people with the name include:

 Sait Faik Abasıyanık (1906–1954), Turkish writer
 Faik Konica (1875–1942), Albanian writer
 Ali Faik Zaghloul (1924–1995), Egyptian radio presenter

See also
 FAIK is the abbreviation for Finspångs AIK, a sports club in Sweden